María Peláez Navarrete (born 13 November 1977 in Málaga, Andalusia) is a former butterfly swimmer from Spain, who competed at five consecutive Summer Olympics for her native country, starting in 1992. She won the silver medal in the 200 m butterfly at the 1999 European Aquatics Championships in Istanbul, Turkey, after gaining the title in the same event, two years earlier at the European Championships in Seville, Spain.

Notes

References

 Spanish Olympic Committee

External links
 
 
 
 

1977 births
Living people
Spanish female butterfly swimmers
Olympic swimmers of Spain
Swimmers at the 1992 Summer Olympics
Swimmers at the 1996 Summer Olympics
Swimmers at the 2000 Summer Olympics
Swimmers at the 2004 Summer Olympics
Swimmers at the 2008 Summer Olympics
European Aquatics Championships medalists in swimming
Universiade medalists in swimming
Universiade gold medalists for Spain
Mediterranean Games bronze medalists for Spain
Mediterranean Games medalists in swimming
Swimmers at the 2001 Mediterranean Games
Medalists at the 1999 Summer Universiade